Warner Chilcott (formerly Galen) was a company in the pharmaceutical industry based in Rockaway, New Jersey. It was primarily focused on women’s healthcare and dermatology. On October 1, 2013, the company was acquired by Actavis (now Allergan).

History

Predecessor companies

Galen
In 1968, Sir Allen McClay founded Galen, a sales and marketing organization focused on branded pharmaceutical products in the United Kingdom and the Republic of Ireland.

In 1997, the company listed its shares on the London Stock Exchange and the Irish Stock Exchange.

Warner Chilcott
Warner Chilcott was the generic drug business of Warner–Lambert.

In 1996, it was sold to Nale Laboratories P.L.C.

In 2004, the company was acquired by several private equity firms. In 2006, it became a public company via an initial public offering.

Merger of Galen and Warner Chilcott
In 2000, Galen acquired Warner Chilcott and listed its American depositary receipts on NASDAQ.

In 2004, the company changed its name from Galen to Warner Chilcott.

Post-merger
In August 2004, the company prevailed in a patent case by Teva Pharmaceutical Industries related to Sarafem (Fluoxetine). On May 19, 2006, the company received approval from the Food and Drug Administration for Sarafem.

On October 30, 2009, the company acquired the prescription drug business of Procter & Gamble for $3.1 billion.

On October 1, 2013, the company was acquired by Actavis (now Allergan).

References

1968 establishments in Ireland
Pharmaceutical companies established in 1968
Pharmaceutical companies disestablished in 2013
Defunct pharmaceutical companies of the United States
Pharmaceutical companies based in New Jersey
Defunct companies based in New Jersey
2006 initial public offerings
2013 mergers and acquisitions
Companies formerly listed on the Nasdaq